The 2011–12 ACB season is the 29th season of the Liga ACB, called also Liga Endesa due to sponsorship reasons.

The regular season started on 8 October 2011 and ended on 6 May 2012. Playoffs started on 17 May 2011 and ended on 16 June. FC Barcelona Regal won their 17th title, the second in a row.

Teams and venues
Relegated to LEB Oro
CB Granada (17th)
Menorca Bàsquet (18th)
Promoted from LEB Oro
CB Murcia (Champion)
Blu:sens Monbús (2nd)

1Caja Laboral plays at Iradier Arena during Fernando Buesa Arena extension to 15,000 seats.

Managerial changes

Before the start of the season

During the season

Regular season

League table
{| class="wikitable" style="text-align: center;"
! width=20| # !! Teams !! width=20|P !! width=20|W !! width=20|L !! width=35|PF !! width=35|PA !! Qualification or relegation
|- bgcolor=ACE1AF
|1||align="left"|FC Barcelona Regal || 34 || 29 || 5 || 2639 || 2232 || rowspan=8 align="center"|Qualified for the Playoffs
|- bgcolor=ACE1AF
|2||align="left"|Real Madrid || 34 || 26 || 8 || 2829 || 2513
|- bgcolor=ACE1AF
|3||align="left"|Caja Laboral || 34 || 23 || 11 || 2545 || 2384
|- bgcolor=ACE1AF
|4||align="left"|Valencia Basket || 34 || 20 || 14 || 2531 || 2401
|- bgcolor=ACE1AF
|5||align="left"|Lagun Aro GBC || 34 || 19 || 15 || 2664 || 2578
|- bgcolor=ACE1AF
|6||align="left"|Gescrap Bizkaia || 34 || 19 || 15 || 2642 || 2615
|- bgcolor=ACE1AF
|7||align="left"|Banca Cívica || 34 || 18 || 16 || 2523 || 2460
|- bgcolor=ACE1AF
|8||align="left"|Lucentum Alicante || 34 || 18 || 16 || 2352 || 2439
|-
|9||align="left"|Unicaja || 34 || 17 || 17 || 2509 || 2562
|-
|10||align="left"|CAI Zaragoza || 34 || 16 || 18 || 2404 || 2454
|-
|11||align="left"|FIATC Mutua Joventut || 34 || 16 || 18 || 2493 || 2562
|-
|12||align="left"|Assignia Manresa || 34 || 15 || 19 || 2497 || 2559
|-
|13||align="left"|Blu:sens Monbús || 34 || 13 || 21 || 2405 || 2481
|- 
|14||align="left"|Gran Canaria 2014 || 34 || 13 || 21 || 2268 || 2395
|-
|15||align="left"|UCAM Murcia || 34 || 13 || 21 || 2439 || 2512
|-
|16||align="left"|Mad-Croc Fuenlabrada || 34 || 12 || 22 || 2414 || 2585
|- bgcolor=FFCCCC
|17||align="left"|Asefa Estudiantes || 34 || 11 || 23 || 2394 || 2573 || rowspan=2 align="center"| Relegation to LEB Oro
|- bgcolor=FFCCCC
|18||align="left"|Blancos de Rueda Valladolid || 34 || 9 || 25 || 2349 || 2592
|-

Positions by round
{|class="wikitable sortable" style="text-align: center;"{|class="wikitable sortable" style="text-align: center;"
! Team\Round !! !! !! !! !! !! !! !! !! !! !! !! !! !! !! !! !! !! !! !! !! !! !! !! !! !! !! !! !! !! !! !! !! !!
|-
! !! 01 !! 02 !! 03 !! 04 !! 05 !! 06 !! 07 !! 08 !! 09 !! 10 !! 11 !! 12 !! 13 !! 14 !! 15 !! 16 !! 17 !! 18 !! 19 !! 20 !! 21 !! 22 !! 23 !! 24 !! 25 !! 26 !! 27 !! 28 !! 29 !! 30 !! 31 !! 32 !! 33 !! 34
|-
|align="left"|FC Barcelona Regal ||bgcolor=#ACE1AF|5 ||bgcolor=#ACE1AF|1 ||bgcolor=#ACE1AF|2 ||bgcolor=#ACE1AF|2 ||bgcolor=#ACE1AF|1 ||bgcolor=#ACE1AF|1 ||bgcolor=#ACE1AF|1 ||bgcolor=#ACE1AF|1 ||bgcolor=#ACE1AF|1 ||bgcolor=#ACE1AF|1 ||bgcolor=#ACE1AF|1 ||bgcolor=#ACE1AF|2 ||bgcolor=#ACE1AF|1 ||bgcolor=#ACE1AF|2 ||bgcolor=#ACE1AF|2 ||bgcolor=#ACE1AF|2 ||bgcolor=#ACE1AF|2 ||bgcolor=#ACE1AF|2 ||bgcolor=#ACE1AF|1 ||bgcolor=#ACE1AF|1 ||bgcolor=#ACE1AF|1 ||bgcolor=#ACE1AF|1 ||bgcolor=#ACE1AF|2 ||bgcolor=#ACE1AF|2 ||bgcolor=#ACE1AF|2 ||bgcolor=#ACE1AF|1 ||bgcolor=#ACE1AF|1 ||bgcolor=#ACE1AF|1 ||bgcolor=#ACE1AF|1 ||bgcolor=#ACE1AF|1 ||bgcolor=#ACE1AF|1 ||bgcolor=#ACE1AF|1 ||bgcolor=#ACE1AF|1 ||bgcolor=#ACE1AF|1 
|-
|align="left"|Real Madrid ||bgcolor=#ACE1AF|1 ||bgcolor=#ACE1AF|5 ||bgcolor=#ACE1AF|3 ||bgcolor=#ACE1AF|3 ||bgcolor=#ACE1AF|2 ||bgcolor=#ACE1AF|3 ||bgcolor=#ACE1AF|2 ||bgcolor=#ACE1AF|2 ||bgcolor=#ACE1AF|2 ||bgcolor=#ACE1AF|2 ||bgcolor=#ACE1AF|2 ||bgcolor=#ACE1AF|1 ||bgcolor=#ACE1AF|2 ||bgcolor=#ACE1AF|1 ||bgcolor=#ACE1AF|1 ||bgcolor=#ACE1AF|1 ||bgcolor=#ACE1AF|1 ||bgcolor=#ACE1AF|1 ||bgcolor=#ACE1AF|2 ||bgcolor=#ACE1AF|2 ||bgcolor=#ACE1AF|2 ||bgcolor=#ACE1AF|2 ||bgcolor=#ACE1AF|1 ||bgcolor=#ACE1AF|1 ||bgcolor=#ACE1AF|1 ||bgcolor=#ACE1AF|2 ||bgcolor=#ACE1AF|2 ||bgcolor=#ACE1AF|2 ||bgcolor=#ACE1AF|2 ||bgcolor=#ACE1AF|2 ||bgcolor=#ACE1AF|2 ||bgcolor=#ACE1AF|2 ||bgcolor=#ACE1AF|2 ||bgcolor=#ACE1AF|2
|-
|align="left"|Caja Laboral ||bgcolor=#ACE1AF|3 ||bgcolor=#ACE1AF|3 ||9 ||10 ||bgcolor=#ACE1AF|7 ||bgcolor=#ACE1AF|6 ||bgcolor=#ACE1AF|4 ||bgcolor=#ACE1AF|4 ||bgcolor=#ACE1AF|5 ||bgcolor=#ACE1AF|4 ||bgcolor=#ACE1AF|4 ||bgcolor=#ACE1AF|4 ||bgcolor=#ACE1AF|4 ||bgcolor=#ACE1AF|4 ||bgcolor=#ACE1AF|3 ||bgcolor=#ACE1AF|4 ||bgcolor=#ACE1AF|4 ||bgcolor=#ACE1AF|3 ||bgcolor=#ACE1AF|3 ||bgcolor=#ACE1AF|3 ||bgcolor=#ACE1AF|3 ||bgcolor=#ACE1AF|3 ||bgcolor=#ACE1AF|3 ||bgcolor=#ACE1AF|3 ||bgcolor=#ACE1AF|3 ||bgcolor=#ACE1AF|3 ||bgcolor=#ACE1AF|3 ||bgcolor=#ACE1AF|3 ||bgcolor=#ACE1AF|3 ||bgcolor=#ACE1AF|3 ||bgcolor=#ACE1AF|3 ||bgcolor=#ACE1AF|3 ||bgcolor=#ACE1AF|3 ||bgcolor=#ACE1AF|3
|-
|align="left"|Valencia Basket ||11 ||bgcolor=#ACE1AF|6 ||11 ||bgcolor=#ACE1AF|6 ||bgcolor=#ACE1AF|5 ||bgcolor=#ACE1AF|5 ||bgcolor=#ACE1AF|7 ||bgcolor=#ACE1AF|6 ||bgcolor=#ACE1AF|4 ||bgcolor=#ACE1AF|6 ||bgcolor=#ACE1AF|7 ||bgcolor=#ACE1AF|7 ||bgcolor=#ACE1AF|7 ||bgcolor=#ACE1AF|7 ||bgcolor=#ACE1AF|7 ||bgcolor=#ACE1AF|7 ||9 ||bgcolor=#ACE1AF|8 ||10 ||9 ||bgcolor=#ACE1AF|8 ||10 ||bgcolor=#ACE1AF|8 ||bgcolor=#ACE1AF|5 ||bgcolor=#ACE1AF|4 ||bgcolor=#ACE1AF|4 ||bgcolor=#ACE1AF|5 ||bgcolor=#ACE1AF|4 ||bgcolor=#ACE1AF|4 ||bgcolor=#ACE1AF|4 ||bgcolor=#ACE1AF|6 ||bgcolor=#ACE1AF|5 ||bgcolor=#ACE1AF|5 ||bgcolor=#ACE1AF|4
|-
|align="left"|Lagun Aro GBC ||12 ||15 ||bgcolor=#FFCCCC|17 ||bgcolor=#FFCCCC|18 ||15 ||16 ||13 ||14 ||16 ||bgcolor=#FFCCCC|17 ||15 ||13 ||11 ||9 ||bgcolor=#ACE1AF|8 ||10 ||bgcolor=#ACE1AF|8 ||bgcolor=#ACE1AF|7 ||bgcolor=#ACE1AF|6 ||bgcolor=#ACE1AF|8 ||bgcolor=#ACE1AF|6 ||bgcolor=#ACE1AF|6 ||bgcolor=#ACE1AF|4 ||bgcolor=#ACE1AF|4 ||bgcolor=#ACE1AF|6 ||bgcolor=#ACE1AF|5 ||bgcolor=#ACE1AF|4 ||bgcolor=#ACE1AF|5 ||bgcolor=#ACE1AF|6 ||bgcolor=#ACE1AF|5 ||bgcolor=#ACE1AF|8 ||bgcolor=#ACE1AF|8 ||bgcolor=#ACE1AF|6 ||bgcolor=#ACE1AF|5
|-
|align="left"|Gescrap Bizkaia ||13 ||9 ||bgcolor=#ACE1AF|6 ||11 ||9 ||9 ||9 ||11 ||10 ||10 ||9 ||bgcolor=#ACE1AF|8 ||bgcolor=#ACE1AF|8 ||10 ||11 ||11 ||10 ||9 ||bgcolor=#ACE1AF|8 ||bgcolor=#ACE1AF|6 ||bgcolor=#ACE1AF|7 ||bgcolor=#ACE1AF|8 ||11 ||10 ||bgcolor=#ACE1AF|8 ||bgcolor=#ACE1AF|6 ||bgcolor=#ACE1AF|6 ||bgcolor=#ACE1AF|6 ||bgcolor=#ACE1AF|5 ||bgcolor=#ACE1AF|7 ||bgcolor=#ACE1AF|5 ||bgcolor=#ACE1AF|4 ||bgcolor=#ACE1AF|4 ||bgcolor=#ACE1AF|6
|-
|align="left"|Banca Cívica ||16 ||bgcolor=#ACE1AF|7 ||bgcolor=#ACE1AF|4 ||bgcolor=#ACE1AF|7 ||bgcolor=#ACE1AF|6 ||bgcolor=#ACE1AF|8 ||bgcolor=#ACE1AF|6 ||bgcolor=#ACE1AF|5 ||bgcolor=#ACE1AF|7 ||bgcolor=#ACE1AF|8 ||bgcolor=#ACE1AF|6 ||bgcolor=#ACE1AF|6 ||bgcolor=#ACE1AF|6 ||bgcolor=#ACE1AF|6 ||bgcolor=#ACE1AF|6 ||bgcolor=#ACE1AF|6 ||bgcolor=#ACE1AF|6 ||bgcolor=#ACE1AF|6 ||bgcolor=#ACE1AF|7 ||10 ||10 ||9 ||bgcolor=#ACE1AF|7 ||9 ||bgcolor=#ACE1AF|7 ||10 ||bgcolor=#ACE1AF|8 ||bgcolor=#ACE1AF|7 ||bgcolor=#ACE1AF|7 ||bgcolor=#ACE1AF|6 ||bgcolor=#ACE1AF|4 ||bgcolor=#ACE1AF|6 ||bgcolor=#ACE1AF|7 ||bgcolor=#ACE1AF|7 
|-
|align="left"|Lucentum Alicante ||bgcolor=#ACE1AF|6 ||13 ||10 ||bgcolor=#ACE1AF|5 ||bgcolor=#ACE1AF|4 ||bgcolor=#ACE1AF|4 ||bgcolor=#ACE1AF|5 ||bgcolor=#ACE1AF|7 ||bgcolor=#ACE1AF|6 ||bgcolor=#ACE1AF|5 ||bgcolor=#ACE1AF|5 ||bgcolor=#ACE1AF|5 ||bgcolor=#ACE1AF|5 ||bgcolor=#ACE1AF|5 ||bgcolor=#ACE1AF|5 ||bgcolor=#ACE1AF|5 ||bgcolor=#ACE1AF|5 ||bgcolor=#ACE1AF|5 ||bgcolor=#ACE1AF|4 ||bgcolor=#ACE1AF|5 ||bgcolor=#ACE1AF|5 ||bgcolor=#ACE1AF|5 ||bgcolor=#ACE1AF|6 ||bgcolor=#ACE1AF|8 ||bgcolor=#ACE1AF|5 ||9 ||bgcolor=#ACE1AF|7 ||bgcolor=#ACE1AF|8 ||bgcolor=#ACE1AF|8 ||bgcolor=#ACE1AF|8 ||bgcolor=#ACE1AF|7 ||bgcolor=#ACE1AF|7 ||bgcolor=#ACE1AF|8 ||bgcolor=#ACE1AF|8
|-
|align="left"|Unicaja ||bgcolor=#ACE1AF|2 ||bgcolor=#ACE1AF|2 ||bgcolor=#ACE1AF|1 ||bgcolor=#ACE1AF|1 ||bgcolor=#ACE1AF|3 ||bgcolor=#ACE1AF|2 ||bgcolor=#ACE1AF|3 ||bgcolor=#ACE1AF|3 ||bgcolor=#ACE1AF|3 ||bgcolor=#ACE1AF|3 ||bgcolor=#ACE1AF|3 ||bgcolor=#ACE1AF|3 ||bgcolor=#ACE1AF|3 ||bgcolor=#ACE1AF|3 ||bgcolor=#ACE1AF|4 ||bgcolor=#ACE1AF|3 ||bgcolor=#ACE1AF|3 ||bgcolor=#ACE1AF|4 ||bgcolor=#ACE1AF|5 ||bgcolor=#ACE1AF|4 ||bgcolor=#ACE1AF|4 ||bgcolor=#ACE1AF|4 ||bgcolor=#ACE1AF|5 ||bgcolor=#ACE1AF|7 ||10 ||bgcolor=#ACE1AF|8 ||10 ||9 ||11 ||11 ||12 ||12 ||11 ||9
|-
|align="left"|CAI Zaragoza ||9 ||12 ||bgcolor=#ACE1AF|8 ||12 ||13 ||14 ||11 ||10 ||11 ||12 ||11 ||11 ||9 ||bgcolor=#ACE1AF|8 ||9 ||bgcolor=#ACE1AF|8 ||11 ||10 ||9 ||bgcolor=#ACE1AF|7 ||9 ||bgcolor=#ACE1AF|7 ||9 ||bgcolor=#ACE1AF|6 ||9 ||bgcolor=#ACE1AF|7 ||9 ||10 ||9 ||9 ||9 ||9 ||10 ||10
|-
|align="left"|FIATC Mutua Joventut ||15 ||11 ||13 ||15 ||12 ||15 ||bgcolor=#FFCCCC|17 ||12 ||14 ||11 ||13 ||15 ||14 ||14 ||15 ||15 ||14 ||14 ||14 ||14 ||14 ||13 ||13 ||12 ||12 ||14 ||11 ||12 ||12 ||12 ||11 ||11 ||9 ||11
|-
|align="left"|Assignia Manresa ||bgcolor=#ACE1AF|4 ||bgcolor=#ACE1AF|4 ||bgcolor=#ACE1AF|7 ||bgcolor=#ACE1AF|4 ||bgcolor=#ACE1AF|8 ||bgcolor=#ACE1AF|7 ||bgcolor=#ACE1AF|8 ||bgcolor=#ACE1AF|8 ||9 ||9 ||10 ||12 ||13 ||12 ||12 ||12 ||12 ||12 ||11 ||12 ||11 ||11 ||10 ||11 ||11 ||11 ||12 ||11 ||10 ||10 ||10 ||10 ||12 ||12
|-
|align="left"|Blu:sens Monbús ||bgcolor=#ACE1AF|7 ||10 ||bgcolor=#ACE1AF|5 ||9 ||10 ||13 ||16 ||bgcolor=#FFCCCC|17 ||bgcolor=#FFCCCC|17 ||13 ||16 ||14 ||15 ||16 ||16 ||16 ||16 ||16 ||16 ||15 ||15 ||15 ||15 ||15 ||15 ||15 ||15 ||15 ||16 ||13 ||16 ||15 ||14 ||13
|-
|align="left"|Gran Canaria 2014 ||bgcolor=#FFCCCC|17 ||bgcolor=#FFCCCC|18 ||14 ||16 ||16 ||bgcolor=#FFCCCC|17 ||14 ||15 ||12 ||14 ||12 ||10 ||12 ||13 ||14 ||13 ||13 ||13 ||13 ||13 ||13 ||14 ||14 ||14 ||14 ||12 ||13 ||13 ||14 ||14 ||13 ||13 ||13 ||14
|-
|align="left"|UCAM Murcia ||14 ||16 ||bgcolor=#FFCCCC|18 ||14 ||bgcolor=#FFCCCC|17 ||12 ||15 ||16 ||13 ||15 ||bgcolor=#FFCCCC|17 ||bgcolor=#FFCCCC|17 ||16 ||bgcolor=#FFCCCC|17 ||bgcolor=#FFCCCC|17 ||bgcolor=#FFCCCC|17 ||bgcolor=#FFCCCC|17 ||bgcolor=#FFCCCC|17 ||bgcolor=#FFCCCC|17 ||bgcolor=#FFCCCC|17 ||16 ||16 ||16 ||16 ||16 ||16 ||16 ||16 ||15 ||16 ||15 ||16 ||16 ||15
|-
|align="left"|Mad-Croc Fuenlabrada ||bgcolor=#FFCCCC|18 ||bgcolor=#FFCCCC|17 ||15 ||bgcolor=#ACE1AF|8 ||11 ||11 ||10 ||9 ||bgcolor=#ACE1AF|8 ||bgcolor=#ACE1AF|7 ||bgcolor=#ACE1AF|8 ||9 ||10 ||11 ||10 ||9 ||bgcolor=#ACE1AF|7 ||11 ||12 ||11 ||12 ||12 ||12 ||13 ||13 ||13 ||14 ||14 ||13 ||15 ||14 ||14 ||15 ||16
|-
|align="left"|Asefa Estudiantes ||bgcolor=#ACE1AF|8 ||14 ||16 ||13 ||14 ||10 ||12 ||13 ||15 ||16 ||14 ||16 ||bgcolor=#FFCCCC|17 ||15 ||13 ||14 ||15 ||15 ||15 ||16 ||bgcolor=#FFCCCC|17 ||bgcolor=#FFCCCC|17 ||bgcolor=#FFCCCC|17 ||bgcolor=#FFCCCC|17 ||bgcolor=#FFCCCC|17 ||bgcolor=#FFCCCC|17 ||bgcolor=#FFCCCC|17 ||bgcolor=#FFCCCC|17 ||bgcolor=#FFCCCC|17 ||bgcolor=#FFCCCC|17 ||bgcolor=#FFCCCC|17 ||bgcolor=#FFCCCC|17 ||bgcolor=#FFCCCC|17 ||bgcolor=#FFCCCC|17
|-
|align="left"|Blancos de Rueda Valladolid ||10 ||bgcolor=#ACE1AF|8 ||12 ||bgcolor=#FFCCCC|17 ||bgcolor=#FFCCCC|18 ||bgcolor=#FFCCCC|18 ||bgcolor=#FFCCCC|18 ||bgcolor=#FFCCCC|18 ||bgcolor=#FFCCCC|18 ||bgcolor=#FFCCCC|18 ||bgcolor=#FFCCCC|18 ||bgcolor=#FFCCCC|18 ||bgcolor=#FFCCCC|18 ||bgcolor=#FFCCCC|18 ||bgcolor=#FFCCCC|18 ||bgcolor=#FFCCCC|18 ||bgcolor=#FFCCCC|18 ||bgcolor=#FFCCCC|18 ||bgcolor=#FFCCCC|18 ||bgcolor=#FFCCCC|18 ||bgcolor=#FFCCCC|18 ||bgcolor=#FFCCCC|18 ||bgcolor=#FFCCCC|18 ||bgcolor=#FFCCCC|18 ||bgcolor=#FFCCCC|18 ||bgcolor=#FFCCCC|18 ||bgcolor=#FFCCCC|18 ||bgcolor=#FFCCCC|18 ||bgcolor=#FFCCCC|18 ||bgcolor=#FFCCCC|18 ||bgcolor=#FFCCCC|18 ||bgcolor=#FFCCCC|18 ||bgcolor=#FFCCCC|18 ||bgcolor=#FFCCCC|18 
|-

Results
{| style="font-size: 85%; text-align: center" class="wikitable"
|-
|
| align="center" width=45|ASE
| width=45|ASS
| width=45|BCS
| width=45|BRV
| width=45|OBR
| width=45|CAI
| width=45|CLA
| width=45|FCB
| width=45|CJB
| width=45|GBB
| width=45|GCA
| width=45|GBC
| width=45|ALI
| width=45|MCF
| width=45|RMB
| width=45|UCM
| width=45|UNI
| width=45|VBC
|-
|align=left|Asefa Estudiantes
| style="background:#ccc;"|
| style="background:#dfd;"|76–70
| style="background:#fdd;"|64–77
| style="background:#dfd;"|69–62
| style="background:#dfd;"|79–62
| style="background:#dfd;"|67–63
| style="background:#fdd;"|54–74
| style="background:#fdd;"|65–80
| style="background:#fdd;"|56–71
| style="background:#fdd;"|69–71
| style="background:#dfd;"|61–52
| style="background:#dfd;"|62–58
| style="background:#fdd;"|68–76
| style="background:#fdd;"|72–76
| style="background:#dfd;"|90–85
| style="background:#fdd;"|80–86
| style="background:#fdd;"|75–84
| style="background:#dfd;"|71–69
|-
|align=left|Assignia Manresa
| style="background:#dfd;"|78–75 
| style="background:#ccc;"|
| style="background:#dfd;"|76–71
| style="background:#dfd;"|80–75
| style="background:#dfd;"|86–77
| style="background:#fdd;"|74–81
| style="background:#dfd;"|72–70
| style="background:#fdd;"|71–77
| style="background:#dfd;"|71–59
| style="background:#dfd;"|81–73
| style="background:#dfd;"|69–60
| style="background:#fdd;"|74–79
| style="background:#fdd;"|62–76
| style="background:#dfd;"|80–59
| style="background:#fdd;"|93–96
| style="background:#dfd;"|83–74
| style="background:#dfd;"|86–68
| style="background:#fdd;"|68–89
|-
|align=left|Banca Cívica
| style="background:#dfd;"|89–61
| style="background:#dfd;"|76–65
| style="background:#ccc;"|
| style="background:#dfd;"|87–73
| style="background:#dfd;"|79–59
| style="background:#dfd;"|77–64
| style="background:#fdd;"|66–73
| style="background:#dfd;"|81–75
| style="background:#fdd;"|73–77
| style="background:#fdd;"|108–110
| style="background:#dfd;"|75–70
| style="background:#fdd;"|59–63
| style="background:#dfd;"|86–61
| style="background:#fdd;"|97–99
| style="background:#fdd;"|63–98
| style="background:#dfd;"|76–60
| style="background:#fdd;"|68–72
| style="background:#dfd;"|65–58
|-
|align=left|Blancos de Rueda Valladolid
| style="background:#fdd;"|68–79 
| style="background:#dfd;"|79–70
| style="background:#fdd;"|72–77
| style="background:#ccc;"|
| style="background:#dfd;"|81–75
| style="background:#fdd;"|58–73
| style="background:#fdd;"|64–76
| style="background:#fdd;"|86–92
| style="background:#dfd;"|86–67
| style="background:#fdd;"|73–81
| style="background:#fdd;"|70–89
| style="background:#dfd;"|89–86
| style="background:#dfd;"|69–57
| style="background:#dfd;"|69–66
| style="background:#fdd;"|72–84
| style="background:#fdd;"|65–76
| style="background:#fdd;"|76–83
| style="background:#dfd;"|74–65
|-
|align=left|Blu:sens Monbús
| style="background:#dfd;"|61–58
| style="background:#dfd;"|61–49
| style="background:#fdd;"|70–77
| style="background:#fdd;"|63–72
| style="background:#ccc;"|
| style="background:#dfd;"|89–84
| style="background:#dfd;"|89–87
| style="background:#fdd;"|83–89
| style="background:#dfd;"|73–60
| style="background:#fdd;"|65–79
| style="background:#dfd;"|65–45
| style="background:#fdd;"|80–88
| style="background:#fdd;"|69–73
| style="background:#fdd;"|77–85
| style="background:#fdd;"|69–83
| style="background:#dfd;"|69–62
| style="background:#fdd;"|71–78
| style="background:#dfd;"|76–62
|-
|align=left|CAI Zaragoza
| style="background:#dfd;"|75–72
| style="background:#dfd;"|72–71
| style="background:#dfd;"|65–59
| style="background:#dfd;"|75–74
| style="background:#dfd;"|80–71
| style="background:#ccc;"|
| style="background:#dfd;"|86–66
| style="background:#fdd;"|49–68
| style="background:#dfd;"|96–73
| style="background:#fdd;"|59–62
| style="background:#dfd;"|63–61
| style="background:#fdd;"|77–86
| style="background:#dfd;"|65–49
| style="background:#dfd;"|80–78
| style="background:#fdd;"|67–84
| style="background:#dfd;"|67–59
| style="background:#dfd;"|76–59
| style="background:#dfd;"|71–63
|-
|align=left|Caja Laboral
| style="background:#dfd;"|89–74
| style="background:#fdd;"|65–76
| style="background:#dfd;"|73–60
| style="background:#dfd;"|67–65
| style="background:#dfd;"|72–53
| style="background:#dfd;"|75–65
| style="background:#ccc;"|
| style="background:#dfd;"|71–60
| style="background:#fdd;"|66–68
| style="background:#dfd;"|100–70
| style="background:#dfd;"|71–67
| style="background:#dfd;"|86–74
| style="background:#dfd;"|65–55
| style="background:#dfd;"|61–51
| style="background:#dfd;"|67–66
| style="background:#dfd;"|71–65
| style="background:#dfd;"|90–68
| style="background:#fdd;"|72–82
|-
|align=left|FC Barcelona Regal
| style="background:#dfd;"|97–51
| style="background:#dfd;"|74–61
| style="background:#fdd;"|63–66
| style="background:#dfd;"|77–67
| style="background:#dfd;"|71–58
| style="background:#dfd;"|71–68
| style="background:#dfd;"|97–89
| style="background:#ccc;"|
| style="background:#dfd;"|82–70
| style="background:#dfd;"|91–72
| style="background:#dfd;"|65–49
| style="background:#dfd;"|77–61
| style="background:#dfd;"|65–49
| style="background:#dfd;"|86–59
| style="background:#dfd;"|86–83
| style="background:#dfd;"|90–53
| style="background:#dfd;"|72–62
| style="background:#dfd;"|76–72
|-
|align=left|FIATC Mutua Joventut
| style="background:#dfd;"|74–71
| style="background:#dfd;"|92–79
| style="background:#dfd;"|83–65
| style="background:#dfd;"|83–73
| style="background:#dfd;"|73–67
| style="background:#dfd;"|85–63
| style="background:#fdd;"|57–74
| style="background:#fdd;"|52–79
| style="background:#ccc;"|
| style="background:#dfd;"|91–67
| style="background:#fdd;"|73–81
| style="background:#fdd;"|70–93
| style="background:#dfd;"|76–62
| style="background:#fdd;"|62–73
| style="background:#dfd;"|78–75
| style="background:#dfd;"|71–65
| style="background:#dfd;"|80–64
| style="background:#dfd;"|81–73
|-
|align=left|Gescrap Bizkaia
| style="background:#dfd;"|72–66
| style="background:#dfd;"|88–60
| style="background:#fdd;"|67–75
| style="background:#dfd;"|89–77
| style="background:#dfd;"|79–71
| style="background:#dfd;"|68–57
| style="background:#fdd;"|79–80
| style="background:#fdd;"|65–72
| style="background:#dfd;"|78–72
| style="background:#ccc;"|
| style="background:#dfd;"|78–72
| style="background:#fdd;"|87–93
| style="background:#dfd;"|73–60
| style="background:#dfd;"|92–81
| style="background:#dfd;"|86–82
| style="background:#dfd;"|95–80
| style="background:#fdd;"|80–83
| style="background:#dfd;"|85–74
|-
|align=left|Gran Canaria 2014
| style="background:#dfd;"|73–65
| style="background:#fdd;"|63–77
| style="background:#fdd;"|66–74
| style="background:#dfd;"|64–59
| style="background:#dfd;"|84–73
| style="background:#dfd;"|72–62
| style="background:#fdd;"|68–77
| style="background:#dfd;"|93–90
| style="background:#dfd;"|77–71
| style="background:#dfd;"|77–71
| style="background:#ccc;"|
| style="background:#fdd;"|45–78
| style="background:#dfd;"|61–53
| style="background:#dfd;"|70–65
| style="background:#fdd;"|60–68
| style="background:#dfd;"|66–54
| style="background:#dfd;"|60–49
| style="background:#fdd;"|63–71
|-
|align=left|Lagun Aro GBC
| style="background:#dfd;"|103–81
| style="background:#dfd;"|88–82
| style="background:#dfd;"|67–65
| style="background:#dfd;"|71–62
| style="background:#fdd;"|68–71
| style="background:#dfd;"|76–75
| style="background:#dfd;"|81–73
| style="background:#fdd;"|56–71
| style="background:#dfd;"|90–85
| style="background:#fdd;"|76–77
| style="background:#dfd;"|93–78
| style="background:#ccc;"|
| style="background:#fdd;"|68–71
| style="background:#dfd;"|86–70
| style="background:#dfd;"|98–90
| style="background:#fdd;"|67–71
| style="background:#fdd;"|92–95
| style="background:#fdd;"|80–86
|-
|align=left|Lucentum Alicante
| style="background:#fdd;"|65–83
| style="background:#dfd;"|76–70
| style="background:#dfd;"|86–82
| style="background:#dfd;"|91–64
| style="background:#fdd;"|63–64
| style="background:#dfd;"|77–75
| style="background:#dfd;"|72–71
| style="background:#fdd;"|57–83
| style="background:#dfd;"|84–78
| style="background:#dfd;"|81–77
| style="background:#dfd;"|58–55
| style="background:#dfd;"|79–68
| style="background:#ccc;"|
| style="background:#dfd;"|66–55
| style="background:#fdd;"|86–92
| style="background:#dfd;"|63–62
| style="background:#fdd;"|77–97
| style="background:#fdd;"|65–70
|-
|align=left|Mad-Croc Fuenlabrada
| style="background:#dfd;"|88–80
| style="background:#fdd;"|73–79
| style="background:#fdd;"|70–75
| style="background:#dfd;"|65–54
| style="background:#fdd;"|63–82
| style="background:#fdd;"|88–95
| style="background:#fdd;"|87–92
| style="background:#fdd;"|56–66
| style="background:#fdd;"|55–72
| style="background:#dfd;"|82–73
| style="background:#dfd;"|69–65
| style="background:#dfd;"|71–63
| style="background:#fdd;"|60–64
| style="background:#ccc;"|
| style="background:#fdd;"|57–79
| style="background:#dfd;"|89–73
| style="background:#dfd;"|80–78
| style="background:#fdd;"|68–90
|-
|align=left|Real Madrid
| style="background:#dfd;"|85–80
| style="background:#dfd;"|83–61
| style="background:#dfd;"|78–65
| style="background:#dfd;"|76–55
| style="background:#dfd;"|81–67
| style="background:#dfd;"|85–71
| style="background:#dfd;"|84–73
| style="background:#dfd;"|78–74
| style="background:#dfd;"|95–82
| style="background:#fdd;"|90–93
| style="background:#dfd;"|90–72
| style="background:#dfd;"|82–74
| style="background:#dfd;"|91–87
| style="background:#dfd;"|88–70
| style="background:#ccc;"|
| style="background:#dfd;"|80–79
| style="background:#dfd;"|64–51
| style="background:#dfd;"|81–64
|-
|align=left|UCAM Murcia
| style="background:#dfd;"|88–75
| style="background:#dfd;"|78–60
| style="background:#dfd;"|65–58
| style="background:#dfd;"|85–56
| style="background:#fdd;"|60–85
| style="background:#dfd;"|76–62
| style="background:#fdd;"|67–75
| style="background:#fdd;"|54–62
| style="background:#dfd;"|76–54
| style="background:#dfd;"|73–69
| style="background:#dfd;"|76–60
| style="background:#fdd;"|85–89
| style="background:#fdd;"|78–82
| style="background:#dfd;"|71–65
| style="background:#fdd;"|60–91
| style="background:#ccc;"|
| style="background:#dfd;"|86–77
| style="background:#fdd;"|83–86
|-
|align=left|Unicaja
| style="background:#fdd;"|67–74
| style="background:#fdd;"|81–96
| style="background:#dfd;"|75–66
| style="background:#dfd;"|78–51
| style="background:#fdd;"|54–69
| style="background:#dfd;"|79–57
| style="background:#dfd;"|79–66
| style="background:#fdd;"|57–89
| style="background:#dfd;"|89–88
| style="background:#dfd;"|78–73
| style="background:#dfd;"|85–68
| style="background:#fdd;"|81–89
| style="background:#dfd;"|72–60
| style="background:#dfd;"|79–65
| style="background:#fdd;"|80–96
| style="background:#dfd;"|87–79
| style="background:#ccc;"|
| style="background:#fdd;"|58–68
|-
|align=left|Valencia Basket
| style="background:#dfd;"|85–71
| style="background:#dfd;"|75–67
| style="background:#fdd;"|80–84
| style="background:#dfd;"|76–59
| style="background:#dfd;"|77–71
| style="background:#dfd;"|82–66
| style="background:#fdd;"|63–68
| style="background:#fdd;"|68–72
| style="background:#dfd;"|90–67
| style="background:#dfd;"|66–63
| style="background:#dfd;"|77–62
| style="background:#dfd;"|69–60
| style="background:#fdd;"|67–70
| style="background:#fdd;"|69–76
| style="background:#dfd;"|83–66
| style="background:#dfd;"|87–80
| style="background:#dfd;"|75–62
| style="background:#ccc;"|
|-

Playoffs

Stats Leaders

Performance Index Rating

Points

Rebounds

Assists

Awards

Regular season MVP
Andrew Panko – Lagun Aro GBC

All-ACB team

ACB Rising Star Award
Micah Downs – Assignia Manresa

Best Coach
Xavi Pascual – Regal FC Barcelona

MVP week by week

Player of the month 
{| class="wikitable sortable" style="text-align: center;"
! align="center"|Month
! align="center"|Week
! align="center"|Player
! align="center"|Team
! align="center"|PIR
! align="center"|Source
|-
|October||1–5||align="left"| Joel Freeland||align="left"|Unicaja||26.3||
|-
|November||6–9||align="left"| Gustavo Ayón||align="left"|Baloncesto Fuenlabrada||24.25|| 
|-
|December||10–13||align="left"| Kaloyan Ivanov||align="left"|Lucentum Alicante||26.5|| 
|-
|January||14–18||align="left"| Justin Doellman||align="left"|Assignia Manresa||25|| 
|-
|February||19–21||align="left"| Sergio Llull||align="left"|Real Madrid||21.7|| 
|-
|March||22–26||align="left"| Sergi Vidal||align="left"|Lagun Aro GBC||21|| 
|-
|April||27–32||align="left"| Boniface N'Dong||align="left"|FC Barcelona Regal||18.2|| 
|-
|April||33–34||align="left"| James Augustine||align="left"|UCAM Murcia||30.0||

References

External links
 ACB.com 
 linguasport.com 

 
Liga ACB seasons
 
Spain